Ranjankhol is a village in Rahata taluka of Ahmednagar district in the Indian state of Maharashtra. It is located close to Shrirampur.

Population
At the 2011 census, the population of the village was 5070, of which 2622 were males and 2448 were females.

Economy
The main occupation of the village is agriculture. Industries are also located here as part of Shrirampur MIDC.

Transport

Road
Shrirampur - Sangamner highway passes through the village.

Rail
Shrirampur railway station is the nearest railway station to the village.

Air
Shirdi Airport is the nearest airport to the village.

See also
List of villages in Rahata taluka

References 

Villages in Ahmednagar district